The Bangladesh Sanjukta Sramik Federation is a national trade union federation in Bangladesh. It is affiliated with the International Trade Union Confederation.

References

National trade union centres of Bangladesh
International Trade Union Confederation